All Hallows' Eve is a 2013 American horror anthology film edited, written, and directed by Damien Leone, in his feature film directorial debut. The film is presented as a series of shorts that two children and their babysitter discover on an unmarked videotape on Halloween night, all of which feature a homicidal clown named Art the Clown. The film stars Katie Maguire, Catherine Callahan, Marie Maser, and Kayla Lian, with Mike Giannelli as Art the Clown. It incorporates footage from the 2008 short film The 9th Circle, as well as the 2011 short film Terrifier, both of which were also directed by Leone and featured Art the Clown.

All Hallows' Eve was released direct-to-video by Image Entertainment on October 29, 2013, and received mixed reviews. The film was followed by a standalone anthology sequel, All Hallows' Eve 2, in 2015, which features segments by different directors. The character of Art the Clown would later be featured in the 2016 film Terrifier and the 2022 sequel Terrifier 2, both written and directed by Leone.

Plot
After a night of trick-or-treating on Halloween, babysitter Sarah is surprised to see that children Tia and Timmy have received an unmarked VHS tape in one of their bags. The children convince Sarah to allow them to watch the tape, which contains three stories, each of which features a homicidal clown named Art.

The first segment features a young woman named Casey, who is drugged and kidnapped by Art the Clown while waiting for a train. She awakens to find herself chained in a room with two other women, Kristen and Sara. When Sara is dragged away by her chain, Casey and Kristen decide to follow where their chains lead. Upon reaching the end of the chains, Casey attempts to break the chains with a large rock but is interrupted by a deformed humanoid who dismembers Kristen with a cleaver. The humanoid unwittingly frees Casey by severing her chains with the cleaver, but she soon is tied down and surrounded by hooded figures. After watching the figures remove a fetus from the womb of a restrained pregnant woman, Casey is raped by Satan. After the segment ends, Sarah sends Tia and Timmy to bed and decides to continue watching the VHS tape by herself.

The second segment features Caroline, a woman who has just moved into a new countryside home. A bright object crashes near the house at night, and a power outage occurs. Caroline finds that her phone and car are malfunctioning and suspects that someone other than herself is in the house. She suddenly receives a call from her husband, John, a painter, but the connection soon breaks. She discovers that she is being stalked by an alien, and after managing to disorient it, she hides in a small room under a staircase. There, her phone rings again, alerting the alien to her location. As the alien drags her off, she pulls a sheet off of one of John's paintings, revealing an image of Art the Clown.

The third and final segment features a costume designer driving down an isolated road. Stopping at a gas station, she finds the attendant furiously kicking out Art, who had apparently smeared feces on the gas station's bathroom walls. The attendant fills her tank and hears a noise from inside the gas station while giving the costume designer directions. He goes inside to investigate, and when he does not return, the costume designer enters the building and sees Art chopping up the attendant's body with a hacksaw. She flees, and a chase ensues. Art eventually appears behind her seat in her car and attempts to suffocate her with cellophane. She slams on the brakes and escapes, barricading herself inside a large shed. Art digs his way into the shed and slashes her with a makeshift whip composed of sharp instruments. She stabs Art in the eye with a scalpel and in the back with a knife. She escapes again and is picked up by a man who tries to drive her to a nearby police station. Art follows them in a car and shoots the man in the head with a handgun, causing their car to crash into a tree. After some time, the costume designer regains consciousness on a crude operating table and finds that Art has amputated her limbs and breasts and carved misogynistic obscenities into her body.

Disturbed, Sarah turns off the television. A home phone rings, and when Sarah answers it, she hears the costume designer from the third segment pleading for help. The television turns back on, displaying a dingy room. Art steps into the frame, approaches Sarah from within the screen, and begins to pound on the glass. Sarah then sees herself on the television screen, with Art behind her. She frantically removes the tape from the VCR and smashes it on the floor, destroying it. Shortly afterwards, she hears Tia and Timmy scream. Sarah runs upstairs and sees Art the Clown outside their room, covered in blood, laughing at her and gleefully gesturing for her to enter. Sarah covers her eyes in terror; when she uncovers them seconds later, Art has disappeared. Sarah enters the room, finding Tia and Timmy's bodies hacked apart and "ART" written on the wall in blood.

Cast

 Katie Maguire as Sarah
 Catherine Callahan as Caroline
 Marie Maser as Costume Designer
 Kayla Lian as Casey
 Mike Giannelli as Art the Clown
 Sydney Freihofer as Tia
 Cole Mathewson as Timmy
 Brandon deSpain as Alien
 Michael Chmiel as Attendant / John (voice)
 Marissa Wolf as Kristen
 Minna Taylor as Sara
Daniel Rodas as Man in Car
Christine Evangelista as Scarecrow
Anna Maliere as Pregnant Woman
Eric Diez as Satan

Production

Leone created the character of Art the Clown, who was first featured in the short film The 9th Circle, which Leone wrote and directed. The short was filmed on 35 mm in 2006 and premiered at the Backseat Film Festival in 2008. Leone then wrote and directed Terrifier, another short film featuring Art that was released in 2011. All Hallows' Eve producer Jesse Baget viewed the Terrifier short on YouTube, prompting to him to consider including it in an anthology film with shorts by other filmmakers. According to Leone, "I wasn't having that, and talked him into letting me shoot everything. He was totally cool with it, and allowed me to write more and use the two shorts I had already made to create a whole, cohesive film."

The 9th Circle, with additional footage that was not included in the original short film, serves as the first segment of All Hallows' Eve, while the Terrifier short serves as the film's third segment. In regards to the film's second segment, Leone stated: "A lot of people ask me why we didn't do another Art the Clown story, and I felt if I gave people another 15 or 20 minutes of him killing someone, it would take away from the impact of 'Terrifier. He originally intended for the alien in the second segment to be created using puppetry, but due to time and budgetary constraints, the alien was portrayed by actor Brandon deSpain in a costume.

Release
All Hallows' Eve was released on DVD and digital by Image Entertainment on October 29, 2013. It was first released on Blu-ray as a double feature with the 2013 film Mischief Night on September 9, 2014. Image re-released the film on DVD on September 13, 2016 as a double feature with the 2015 film All Hallows' Eve 2. All Hallows' Eve received a standalone Blu-ray release in August 2019.

Reception
All Hallows' Eve has received mixed reviews. Rod Lott of the Oklahoma Gazette wrote: "what All Hallows' Eve lacks in production value, writer/director/editor/makeup artist Damien Leone makes up for in pure passion. One can tell this guy loves the spirit of the season, and it shows in his terror trilogy, which has all the makings of becoming a minor cult hit."  A reviewer for Ain't It Cool News praised the character of Art the Clown, calling him "somewhat iconic" and "pretty terrifying", but criticized the film's "paper-thin" storyline, writing that "I can only imagine the fear would have been multiplied exponentially had the filmmakers spent as much time on the story as they did with coming up with the creepy as all get-out monster."

Madeleine Koestner of Fangoria wrote that the film's first segment "makes absolutely no sense", and went on to call the second segment "inexcusably uninteresting", referring to the third segment as "easily the best of the three."  She commended the special effects and character designs, and noted that "there's something legitimately creepy about this movie." Brad McHargue of Dread Central gave the film a score of 3.5 out of 5, writing that Art could "be destined to become a horror icon", and concluding: "Through all of its flaws, [...] All Hallows' Eve shows tremendous talent both in front of and behind the camera. [...] while it's not a perfect film, it hints at a promising future for Leone and, if we're lucky, Art the Clown." Adrian Halen of HorrorNews.net called it "easily one of the scariest films I've seen this year", writing that it "tends to transcend its own setting by playing on viewers fears and sense of nightmarish realism."

Tom Becker of DVD Verdict criticized the film's "unimaginative writing, uninspired acting, and tacky effects", and wrote that "It's not a bad film, especially, just not a particularly good or memorable one. [...] Worth a look if your cable is out and you've exhausted Netflix and Redbox." Felix Vasquez Jr. of Cinema Crazed called the film "a pointless exercise in the anthology format with no real stand out stories, or performances in the bunch. Even with Generic the Clown acting as the basic clothesline for all of the tales, Damien Leone’s indie anthology horror film is a very forgettable and dull genre entry."

Sequel and spin-off
All Hallows' Eve 2 is a standalone anthology film from Ruthless Pictures and producer/director Jesse Baget containing nine story segments, each with a different director. The film was released on VOD and digital on October 6, 2015, and had a DVD release on February 2, 2016.

A spin-off, full-length film featuring Art the Clown, titled Terrifier, was released in 2016.

References

External links
 
 
 

2013 films
2013 direct-to-video films
2013 horror films
American horror anthology films
American slasher films
American supernatural horror films
Demons in film
Direct-to-video horror films
Films about extraterrestrial life
Halloween horror films
Horror films about clowns
2013 directorial debut films
2010s monster movies
American exploitation films
American splatter films
2010s English-language films
Films directed by Damien Leone
2010s American films
2010s slasher films